Peace Pipe is the eighth and final studio album by Native American rock band Redbone. It was initially released in 2005 under the name One World and was re-titled and re-released in 2009. The album was released in digital format in 2012, along with a music video for the track "One World".

Track listing
"Beverly Blvd. Blues" (Pat Vegas / Lolly Vegas) – 3:36
"I Am Somebody" (P. Vegas / L. Vegas) – 4:23
"One World" (P. Vegas / L. Vegas / Gino Dente) – 3:02
"It's a Brand New Day" (P. Vegas / L. Vegas) – 3:56
"Love is Magic" (P. Vegas / L. Vegas) – 3:33
"Custer Had It Coming" (P. Vegas) – 2:57
"Mystery Man" (P. Vegas / L. Vegas / G. Dente / Jimmy Greenspoon) – 4:30
"Arigato" (P. Vegas / L. Vegas / G. Dente / J. Greenspoon) – 3:16
"Bad Boys" (P. Vegas / L. Vegas / Paul Smith) – 3:47
"The Best for You" (P. Vegas / Tony Avila) – 4:34

Personnel

 Lolly Vegas – guitars, vocals
 Pat Vegas – bass, vocals, percussion?

References

2005 albums
Redbone (band) albums